
Dębica County is a unit of territorial administration and local government (powiat) in Subcarpathian Voivodeship, south-eastern Poland. It was created on 1 January 1999 as a result of the Polish local government reforms passed in 1998.

As of 2019 its total population is 135,348, out of which the population of Dębica is 45,634, that of Pilzno is 4,912, that of Brzostek is 2,752, and the rural population is 82,050.

Neighbouring counties
Dębica County is bordered by Mielec County to the north, Ropczyce-Sędziszów County to the east, Strzyżów County to the south-east, Jasło County to the south, and Tarnów County and Dąbrowa County to the west.

Administrative division
The county is subdivided into seven gminas (one urban, two urban-rural and four rural). These are listed in the following table, in descending order of population.

Transport
Debica is the county's only rail junction, from which lines emerge in three directions – eastwards to Rzeszow, westwards to Tarnow and northwards to Mielec. The west–east line, which goes from Wrocław via Debica, to Przemyśl, is electrified and is regarded as one of the most important rail connections in Poland. The line to Mielec, which goes further northwards to Tarnobrzeg and Sandomierz, is of secondary importance and is not electrified.

The county is conveniently located along the longest route in Europe, E40. Also, in Pilzno, the E40 road crosses with Polish national main road number 73, which goes from Kielce to Jasło.

References

 
Land counties of Podkarpackie Voivodeship